Jacob "Jaap" Stockmann (born 24 July 1984) is a retired Dutch field hockey player, who played as a goalkeeper for the Dutch national team. Stockmann was announced FIH Best Goalkeeper of the World in 2014.

In 2008 he was the reserve goalkeeper in the Dutch team that came in fourth at the Olympic Games in Beijing. At the 2012 Summer Olympics and 2016 Summer Olympics, he was the starting goalkeeper. Stockmann won the silver medal in 2012.  Stockmann has played for HC Bloemendaal in the Dutch League (Hoofdklasse). With HC Bloemendaal, he won the Euro Hockey League in the 2008–09, 2012–13 and 2017–18 seasons. He also played for the Punjab Warriors in the Hockey India League, and won the player of the tournament for the 2014 edition.

Honours

Club
Bloemendaal
Dutch national title: 2005–06, 2006–07, 2007–08, 2008–09, 2009–10
Euro Hockey League: 2008–09, 2012–13, 2017–18

International
Netherlands
 EuroHockey Championships: 2015
 World League: 2012–13

Individual
FIH Goalkeeper of the Year: 2014
Hockey India League MVP: 2014

References

External links 
 

1984 births
Living people
Dutch male field hockey players
People from Bunnik
2010 Men's Hockey World Cup players
Field hockey players at the 2012 Summer Olympics
2014 Men's Hockey World Cup players
Field hockey players at the 2016 Summer Olympics
Olympic field hockey players of the Netherlands
Olympic silver medalists for the Netherlands
Olympic medalists in field hockey
Medalists at the 2012 Summer Olympics
SV Kampong players
HC Bloemendaal players
Male field hockey goalkeepers
Hockey India League players
Sportspeople from Utrecht (province)
20th-century Dutch people
21st-century Dutch people